Iván Silva Alberola (born 12 June 1982 in Barcelona) is a Spanish Grand Prix motorcycle road racer. He races in the RFME Superstock 1000 Championship aboard a Suzuki GSX-R1000.

Silva has made occasional substitute racing appearances in MotoGP. After appearing in 2005 he filled in for D'Antin at Donington Park and Brno in 2006, as their regular rider Alex Hofmann was filling in for Sete Gibernau on a works Ducati. Despite targeting a full-time ride for 2007, he remained in a testing role, but again raced for the team at Brno, this time replacing an injured Hofmann. He noted that "I am happy to have the possibility to run in MotoGP again, especially this year where we have at our disposal the best tyres and bike of the moment", although his performance disguised this fact – he finished last in every practice session and in qualifying, despite Casey Stoner taking pole on identical equipment. He also entered the  Superbike World Championship round in Qatar for the La Glisse team, taking 7th place in the one race his bike finished.

Career statistics

By season

By class

Races by year
(key)

Supersport World Championship

Races by year

Superbike World Championship

Races by year
(key) (Races in bold indicate pole position) (Races in italics indicate fastest lap)

References

External links

Living people
Spanish motorcycle racers
Motorcycle racers from Catalonia
Avintia Racing MotoGP riders
Superbike World Championship riders
1982 births
Supersport World Championship riders
FIM Superstock 1000 Cup riders
Pramac Racing MotoGP riders
MotoGP World Championship riders